Jiří Novák was the defending champion but did not compete that year.

Àlex Corretja won in the final 6–3, 7–6(7–3), 7–6(7–3) against Gastón Gaudio.

Seeds
A champion seed is indicated in bold while text in italics indicates the round in which that seed was eliminated.

  Albert Costa (first round)
  Juan Carlos Ferrero (second round)
  Roger Federer (second round)
  Andrei Pavel (second round)
  Juan Ignacio Chela (first round)
  Nicolás Lapentti (first round)
  Gastón Gaudio (final)
  Àlex Corretja (champion)

Draw

 NB: The Final was the best of 5 sets while all other rounds were the best of 3 sets.

Final

Section 1

Section 2

References
 2002 Allianz Suisse Open Gstaad Draw

Swiss Open (tennis)
2002 ATP Tour
2002 Allianz Suisse Open Gstaad